This is a list of states in the Holy Roman Empire beginning with the letter G:

References

G